Universia is a network that consists of 1,401 universities in 20 countries: Andorra, Argentina, Bolivia, Brazil, Chile, Colombia, Costa Rica, Ecuador, El Salvador, Spain, Guatemala, Honduras, Mexico, Nicaragua, Panama, Paraguay, Peru, Portugal, Dominican Republic and Uruguay. It has 20 internet sites, one for each country, and a global site which offers information and contents from across the network. Universia network represents 10.1 million students, 8 million users and 850,000 university teaching staff (75% of the total number of students and staff in these countries); the network is sponsored by Santander Bank.

Objectives 
The goal of Universia is to:
 promote change and innovation in products and services linked to the academic community, helping universities to develop shared projects and create new opportunities.
 help universities build the future, which, under the name of Web 2.0, presents the user with challenges linked to interactivity, the creation of communities, the organization of content, and multimedia development,
 promote opportunities for the exchange of experience and collaboration.
 give to university students employment and scholarship opportunities as well as new ways to develop themselves both academically and professionally.
 share technological innovation opportunities,

History 
Universia was created in July 2000 as an internet initiative in the higher education sector.  It is promoted by a group of Spanish universities with the support of the Spanish University Rectors' Board (CRUE), the Spanish National Research Council (CSIC) and sponsored by the Santander Group. 

Universia was officially presented in Madrid (Spain) on July 9, 2000, as a Spanish initiative with a clear Spanish American vocation. On the same day almost all the Universia societies were also formally incorporated (Argentina, Brazil, Chile, Colombia, Spain, Mexico, Peru, Puerto Rico and Venezuela). The Portuguese branch was created a year later, followed by Uruguay in November 2005. 

During the 2008, Universia welcomed Andorra, Panama, Paraguay and Dominican Republic. In order to expand the network towards the world, during March 2009 the basic information of Universia was published in Wikipedia in five languages under the edition and translation of Pabsi González from Universia Puerto Rico (http://www.universia.pr)

Today, Universia is the largest network of universities in the world and more countries have been added, such as: Bolivia, Costa Rica, Ecuador, El Salvador, Guatemala, Honduras and Nicaragua.

Services and content

Preuniversia 
Assists students from high school and helps them find scholarships as well as the right university or higher education institution.

Academic Mobility (MAI) 
Helps students that are studying abroad and helps the ones that want to do it to find the best programs and scholarships available.

Jobs 
Universia offers jobs in and outside the local job market.

Development 
Offers conferences and seminars for development of professional education

Universia News 
Universia News offers themed news: local universities, international universities, scholarships, jobs, culture and more.

Scholarships 
Universia is the encounter point in which students find monetary aid that helps them continue studying.

Calendar 
Local cultural activities are published.

References 
References and university catalogs are included in this virtual library.

Courses 
Promotion and  details of the courses offered in Universia’s universities.

Academic research 
Search tool with students’ interests in mind.

Blogs 
Universia’s writers create blogs in which students and professors can participate by asking questions, sharing experiences and providing feedback. The four blogs are: Study Abroad, Jobs, Marketing and Movies.

Innoversia 
A system that gets in contact both investigators and businesses in order to find applicable solutions to the current needs of the business world and generate beneficial contributions for both spheres of activity.

Universia TV 
Audiovisual material that shows Universia’s community some of the activities and promotions related to students, universities and current academic affairs.

Newsletters 
Universia has four newsletters which can be accessed in the following URL: https://web.archive.org/web/20090317074045/http://www.universia.pr/pdf/publicaciones.jsp
  Universia Knowledge@Wharton
  Next Wave Science
  GCG: Revista de Globalización, Competitividad y Gobernabilidad
  Universia Business Review

Universia Network 

Universia.Net
Universia Andorra 
Universia Argentina
Universia Brasil
Universia Chile
Universia Colombia
Universia Mexico

Universia Bolivia 
Universia Costa Rica 
Universia Ecuador 
Universia El Salvador 
Universia Guatemala 
Universia Honduras 
Universia Nicaragua 

Universia Panama
Universia Paraguay
Universia Peru
Universia Portugal
Universia Dominican Republic
Universia Spain
Universia Uruguay

Academic computer network organizations